The 2018 Rossendale Borough Council election took place on 3 May 2018 to elect members of Rossendale Borough Council in England. This was on the same day as other local elections. Labour remained in control of the council, despite losing one seat to the Conservatives.

banana

Election result

Ward results

Eden

Goodshaw

Greenfield

Greensclough

Hareholme

Healey and Whitworth

Helmshore

Irwell

Longholme

Stacksteads

Whitewell

Worsley

References

Rossendale
Rossendale Borough Council elections